The 2018 Islington London Borough Council election took place on 3 May 2018 to elect members of Islington London Borough Council in England. This was on the same day as other local elections. The council had previously had elections in 2014. The Labour Party retained control of the council, winning 47 of the 48 seats. The sole non-Labour councillor elected was Caroline Russell of the Green Party.

Election result

Ward results

Barnsbury

Bunhill

Caledonian

Canonbury

Clerkenwell

Finsbury Park

Highbury East

Highbury West

Hillrise

Holloway

Junction

Mildmay

St George's

St Mary's

St Peter's

Tollington

By-elections 2018-2022

References

2018 London Borough council elections
2018